Rostromyrmex is a genus of ants in the subfamily Myrmicinae containing the single species Rostromyrmex pasohensis. The genus is known from Peninsular Malaysia, where the ants live in the leaf litter with colonies located in rotten wood on the forest floor. Colonies are small and likely monogyne.

References

Myrmicinae
Monotypic ant genera
Hymenoptera of Asia